The Boys' 800 metres at the 2013 World Youth Championships in Athletics was held  on 10–13 July.

Medalists 
Gold: Alfred Kipketer  1:48.01
Silver: Konstantin Tolokonnikov  1:48.29
Bronze: Kyle Langford  1:48.32

Records 
Prior to the competition, the following records were as follows.

Heats 
Qualification rule: first 4 of each heat (Q) and the next 4 fastest qualified.

Heat 1

Heat 2

Heat 3

Heat 4

Heat 5

Semifinals 
Qualification rule: first 2 of each heat (Q) plus the 2 fastest times (q) qualified.

Heat 1

Heat 2

Heat 3

Final 
Results:

References 

2013 World Youth Championships in Athletics